In music, modernism is an aesthetic stance underlying the period of change and development in musical language that occurred around the turn of the 20th century, a period of diverse reactions in challenging and reinterpreting older categories of music, innovations that led to new ways of organizing and approaching harmonic, melodic, sonic, and rhythmic aspects of music, and changes in aesthetic worldviews in close relation to the larger identifiable period of modernism in the arts of the time. The operative word most associated with it is "innovation". Its leading feature is a "linguistic plurality", which is to say that no one music genre ever assumed a dominant position.

 Examples include the celebration of Arnold Schoenberg's rejection of tonality in chromatic post-tonal and twelve-tone works and Igor Stravinsky's move away from symmetrical rhythm.

Authorities typically regard musical modernism as an historical period or era extending from about 1890 to 1930, and apply the term "postmodernism" to the period or era after 1930. For the musicologist Carl Dahlhaus the purest form was over by 1910, but other historians consider modernism to end with one or the other of the two world wars.

Definitions

Carl Dahlhaus describes modernism as: an obvious point of historical discontinuity ... The "breakthrough" of Mahler, Strauss, and Debussy implies a profound historical transformation ... If we were to search for a name to convey the breakaway mood of the 1890s (a mood symbolized musically by the opening bars of Strauss's Don Juan) but without imposing a fictitious unity of style on the age, we could do worse than revert to Hermann Bahr's term "modernism" and speak of a stylistically open-ended "modernist music" extending (with some latitude) from 1890 to the beginnings of our own twentieth-century modern music in 1910.

Eero Tarasti defines musical modernism directly in terms of "the dissolution of the traditional tonality and transformation of the very foundations of tonal language, searching for new models in atonalism, polytonalism or other forms of altered tonality", which took place around the turn of the century.

Daniel Albright proposes a definition of musical modernism as, "a testing of the limits of aesthetic construction" and presents the following modernist techniques or styles:

Conductor and scholar Leon Botstein describes musical modernism as "...a consequence of the fundamental conviction among successive generations of composers since 1900 that the means of musical expression in the 20th century must be adequate to the unique and radical character of the age", which led to a reflection in the arts of the progress of science, technology and industry, mechanization, urbanization, mass culture and nationalism.

Other usage
The term "modernism" (and the term "post-modern") has occasionally been applied to some genres of popular music, but not with any very clear definition.

For example, the cultural studies professor Andrew Goodwin writes that "given the confusion of the terms, the identification of postmodern texts has ranged across an extraordinarily divergent, and incoherent profusion of textual instances ... Secondly, there are debates within popular music about pastiche and authenticity. 'Modernism' means something quite different within each of these two fields ... This confusion is obvious in an early formative attempt to understand rock music in postmodern terms". Goodwin argues that instances of modernism in popular music are generally not cited because "it undermines the postmodern thesis of cultural fusion, in its explicit effort to preserve a bourgeois notion of Art in opposition to mainstream, 'commercial' rock and pop".

Author Domenic Priore writes that: "the concept of Modernism was bound up in the very construction of the Greater Los Angeles area, at a time when the city was just beginning to come into its own as an international, cultural center",; it appears that the word is used here as an equivalent of the term "modern". Priore cites "River Deep – Mountain High" by Ike & Tina Turner (1966) and "Good Vibrations" by the Beach Boys (1966). Desiring "a taste of Modern, avant-garde R&B" for the latter's recording, group member and song co-writer Brian Wilson considered the music "advanced rhythm and blues", but received criticism from his bandmates, who derided the track for being "too Modern" during its making.

See also
 List of modernist composers

 Abstractionism
 Avant-garde music
 Experimental music
 Expressionism
 Futurism
 History of music
 Neoclassicism
 Neoconservative postmodernism
 Philosophy of music

References

Sources

External links
 Written Tape Guides – The Contemporary Era, lectures by Prof. John Ronsheim (1927–1997), Antioch College